Kenan Karahodžić (born 29 January 1996) is a Bosnian professional basketball player for Dubrava of the Croatian League. He also represents the Bosnia and Herzegovina national team internationally.

Personal life 
He was born in Bačka Topola, FR Yugoslavia into a Bosniak family. His older brother, Kemal, is also a professional basketball player and represents the Hungarian national team internationally.

He has signed the Declaration on the Common Language, affirming that Croats, Bosniaks, Montenegrins and Serbs speak a common standard and polycentric language.

References

External links 
 Profile at aba-liga.com
 Profile at Euroleague.net

1996 births
Living people
ABA League players
Baloncesto Málaga players
Basketball League of Serbia players
Bosnia and Herzegovina men's basketball players
Bosnia and Herzegovina expatriate basketball people in Serbia
Bosnia and Herzegovina expatriate basketball people in Spain
Bosniaks of Serbia
CB Axarquía players
CB Peñas Huesca players
KK Partizan players
KK Spartak Subotica players
Liga ACB players
Oviedo CB players
People from Bačka Topola
Serbian expatriate basketball people in Croatia
Serbian expatriate basketball people in Spain
Serbian men's basketball players
Power forwards (basketball)